Yaroslav Maslennikov (born 23 April 1982) is a Belarusian ice hockey player who is currently playing for HK Gomel of the Belarusian Extraliga.

Maslennikov competed in the 2013 IIHF World Championship as a member of the Belarus men's national ice hockey team.

References

1982 births
Living people
Belarusian ice hockey players
Russian ice hockey defencemen
People from Rybinsk
Sportspeople from Yaroslavl Oblast